John Franklin Bruce Carruthers (August 31, 1889 – January 13, 1960) was a reverend who ministered to early aviators. 

His son, John Franklin Bruce Carruthers,  presented the Carruthers Aviation Collection to Claremont McKenna College, in Claremont, California, in 1950. Through subsequent gifts and purchases the collection contains about 4,000 volumes. 

He was the chaplain to the Portal of the Folded Wings Shrine to Aviation, in Los Angeles, California.

Early life and education
He was born in Fort Scott, Kansas, on August 31, 1889, to James B. Carruthers and Anna Wood.

He received his A.B. from Princeton University in 1912. He received his A.M. from Princeton in 1917 and later graduated from the Princeton Theological Seminary.

Career
From 1919 to 1924, he was head of the Bible Department at Lafayette College, in Easton, Pennsylvania.

Publications
 The Small Business Problem as I See It (1940)
 Line and Staff. Camp Hopkins (1942)
 Scrapbook of Early Aeronautica with William Upcott
 The Thirteenth Disciple, Founder, Church of All Sinners

References

1889 births
1960 deaths
19th-century  American clergy
19th-century American non-fiction writers
19th-century Presbyterian ministers
20th-century American academics
20th-century  American clergy
20th-century American non-fiction writers
20th-century Presbyterian ministers
American aviation writers
American  chaplains
American expatriates in Switzerland
American male non-fiction writers
American Presbyterian ministers
American religious writers
Boston University alumni
Burials at Valhalla Memorial Park Cemetery
Harvard University alumni
Lafayette College faculty
People from Fort Scott, Kansas
Princeton Theological Seminary alumni
Princeton University alumni
Religious leaders from California
Religious leaders from Kansas
Religious leaders from Pennsylvania
University of Geneva alumni
 University of Pennsylvania alumni
University of Southern California alumni
Writers from Kansas
Writers from Los Angeles
 Writers from Pennsylvania